Perdita californica is a species of bee in the family Andrenidae. It is found in Central America and North America.

Subspecies
Two subspecies are recognised:
 Perdita californica californica (Cresson, 1878)
 Perdita californica inopina Timberlake, 1968

References

Further reading

 
 

Andrenidae
Articles created by Qbugbot
Insects described in 1878